Chicoreus maurus, common name the Maurus murex, is a species of sea snail, a marine gastropod mollusk in the family Muricidae, the murex snails or rock snails.

Description
The size of an adult shell varies between 25 mm and 95 mm.

Distribution
This species occurs in the Pacific Ocean along Hawaii, the Marquesas Islands and New Caledonia.

References

External links
 

Muricidae
Gastropods described in 1833
Taxa named by William Broderip